Vapor is an open source web framework written in Swift. It can be used to create RESTful APIs, web apps, and real-time applications using WebSockets. In addition to the core framework, Vapor provides an ORM, a templating language, and packages to facilitate user authentication and authorization.

Vapor's source code is hosted on GitHub and licensed under the MIT License. Vapor has been a part of Swift's Server APIs working group since 2016.

History
Vapor 0.1.0 was released as a proof of concept for Swift on the server a month after Apple open sourced Swift and began Linux platform support on December 3, 2015. Vapor 1.0 arrived in September 2016, followed by the release of Vapor 2.0 in May 2017.

The framework was rewritten for Vapor 3.0 to be built on Apple's non-blocking networking framework SwiftNIO. Vapor 3 was released in May 2018. Apple cited the speed with which Vapor (along with Kitura) adopted the new SwiftNIO framework on the main Swift.org server page.

Vapor 3's beta period saw educational material published by Packt, Paul Hudson, Razeware LLC, and lynda.com. Vapor was recognized by Swift.org with an official Swift Forum in its inaugural group of Related Projects in May 2018.

Vapor 4's Alpha 1 Release started in May 2019 and the stable version released in April 2020.

Releases

Source: Vapor Docs & GitHub Releases.

Features 
Vapor supports the following features:

 Async / non-blocking IO
 Authentication: basic, bearer, JWT, and password
 Cache: Redis and in-Memory
 Commands / console formatting
 Content Negotiation: JSON, multipart, and URL-encoded form
 Crypto: RNG, ciphers, digests, RSA
 Dependency Injection / Inversion of Control
 Fluent ORM: MySQL, PostgreSQL, and SQLite
 HTTP Client and Server
 Leaf Templating: HTML etc
 Logging
 URL Routing
 Validation
 WebSocket client and server
 Queue Jobs

References 

Web frameworks